The 1955 Pacific Tigers football team represented the College of the Pacific during the 1955 college football season.

Pacific competed as an independent in 1955. They played home games in Pacific Memorial Stadium in Stockton, California. In their third season under head coach Jack Myers, the Tigers finished with a record of five wins and four losses (5–4). For the season they outscored their opponents 132–121.

Schedule

Team players in the NFL
The following College of the Pacific players were selected in the 1956 NFL Draft.

The following finished their college career in 1955, were not drafted, but played in the NFL.

Notes

References

Pacific
Pacific Tigers football seasons
Pacific Tigers football